Leptoconchus lamarckii is a species of sea snail, a marine gastropod mollusk, in the family Muricidae, the murex snails or rock snails.

Distribution
This marine species occurs off Réunion.

References

 Massin C. (1982). Contribution to the knowledge of two boring gastropods with an annotated list of the genera Magilus Montfort, 1810 and Leptoconchus Rüppell, 1835. Bulletin de l'Institut Royal des Sciences Naturelles de Belgique. 53: 1-28.
 Oliverio, M. (2008). Coralliophilinae (Neogastropoda: Muricidae) from the southwest Pacific. in: Héros, V. et al. (Ed.) Tropical Deep-Sea Benthos 25. Mémoires du Muséum national d'Histoire naturelle (1993). 196: 481-585
 Oliverio M. 2008. Coralliophilinae (Neogastropoda: Muricidae) from the Marquesas Islands. Journal of Conchology 39(5): 569-584

External links
 MNHN, Paris: syntype
 Deshayes, G. P. (1863). Catalogue des mollusques de l'île de la Réunion (Bourbon). Pp. 1-144. In Maillard, L. (Ed.) Notes sur l'Ile de la Réunion. Dentu, Paris

lamarckii
Gastropods described in 1863